Lakshmi Sadaiv Mangalam is an Indian Marathi-language television series which aired on Colors Marathi. The show starred Surabhi Hande, Samruddhi Kelkar and Omprakash Shinde in lead roles. The series premiered from 14 May 2018 and ended on 25 May 2019. It is an official remake of Colors Kannada's TV series Lakshmi Baramma.

Cast 
 Omprakash Shinde as Malhar
 Surabhi Hande as Aarvi
 Samruddhi Kelkar as Laxmi
 Hrishikesh Shelar as Ajinkya
 Ketaki Chitale as Aboli

Adaptations

References

External links 
 Lakshmi Sadaiv Mangalam at Voot

2018 Indian television series debuts
Colors Marathi original programming
Marathi-language television shows
2019 Indian television series endings